Maribel Pineda is a Venezuelan sport shooter. At the 2012 Summer Olympics, she competed in the Women's 10 metre air pistol and the Women's 25 metre pistol.

References

Venezuelan female sport shooters
Living people
Olympic shooters of Venezuela
Shooters at the 2012 Summer Olympics
Pan American Games medalists in shooting
Pan American Games silver medalists for Venezuela
Pan American Games bronze medalists for Venezuela
Year of birth missing (living people)
Shooters at the 2015 Pan American Games
South American Games gold medalists for Venezuela
South American Games medalists in shooting
Competitors at the 2014 South American Games
21st-century Venezuelan women